Walnut Canyon National Monument (Hopi: Wupatupqa) is a United States National Monument located about  southeast of downtown Flagstaff, Arizona, near Interstate 40. Other contemporary habitations of the Sinagua people are preserved in the nearby Tuzigoot and Montezuma Castle national monuments.

History

Sinagua is Spanish for "without water", an acknowledgement that the Sinagua people were able to live in such a dry region.  By living in such a region the Sinagua became experts at conserving water and dealing with droughts.  The Sinagua were also believed to have been active traders whose activities and influence stretched to the Gulf of Mexico and even as far as Central America. The Sinagua, who inhabited the dwellings in Walnut Canyon, left mysteriously around 1250 AD. It is thought that the Sinagua left because of fear of neighboring tribes or droughts, but it is not certain.  The Sinagua left over 80 cliff dwellings behind.  The Sinagua built their homes under limestone ledges, deep within the canyon, some time between 1125 and 1250 – taking advantage of the natural recesses in the limestone cliff walls which were eroded over millions of years by flowing water. The dwellings themselves were small, but large enough for the inhabitants to cook and sleep.  Most of the cliff dwelling rooms are situated near the loop trail, typically slightly above the trail and immediately outside the loop itself. A typical room might have been the dwelling of a single family, and might measure approximately two meters high by six meters long by three meters deep.  Because of the area's dry climate, the water present in the canyon was essential for its inhabitants over 700 years ago as it is for animal and plant life today.  The plant life is very diverse in Walnut Canyon, with more than 387 different plant species, including the Prickly Pear cactus and the Arizona Black Walnut.  The biodiversity of the area includes high concentrations of sensitive plant species that probably contributed to the decision made by prehistoric people to settle in the area.

There are other ruins in the  area, but none are publicly accessible. Many more dwellings can be seen up close in the canyon just east of the Monument, although it is illegal to enter the canyon.

Walnut Canyon was proclaimed a national monument on November 30, 1915, by President Woodrow Wilson to preserve the ancient cliff dwellings. It was transferred from the USDA Forest Service to the National Park Service on August 10, 1933. As with all historic areas administered by the National Park Service, the national monument was listed on the National Register of Historic Places on October 15, 1966.  At Walnut Canyon, there are trails for tourists to get a close view of the dwellings.

Geology

Walnut Canyon lies on the Colorado Plateau and cuts through the Permian Kaibab Limestone, which exposes the Toroweap Formation and Coconino Sandstone.  The Kaibab formation also forms the rim of the Grand Canyon.  Crossbedding is present in the Coconino Sandstone.

The Walnut Canyon site contains Walnut Creek, which carved a 600 foot deep canyon that flows east.  The creek joins into the Little Colorado River en route to the Grand Canyon.  The creek has also created a varied and abundant array of vegetation.  The shaded, north-facing walls are covered in fir and ponderosa pine trees.  The sunny, south facing slopes have agaves and several species of cactus including opuntia, echinocereus and cholla.  The floor of the canyon is home to several species of walnut trees, for which the canyon is named.

The rocks in the canyon walls are formed of three distinct layers – the  upper third of Walnut Canyon's walls contain Kaibab Limestone that varies in layers and hardness, where the cliff dwellings are found, which overlies steep, scrub covered slopes of the Toroweap Formation, while the lowest third is the sheer-walled, cross-bedded Coconino Sandstone.  Many layers of the limestone eroded, creating alcoves that the Sinagua Indians used as cave-dwellings.

Today a variety of archeological and natural resources are preserved on approximately 3600 acres.

Climate 
Not all of Arizona is warm dry desert. At Walnut Canyon (6690'/2039m above sea level), has snow in winter, hot sun in summer with afternoon thunderstorms, and in the spring, strong gusty winds on the rim and/or in the canyon.  Even though the climate was and still is somewhat harsh, the Sinagua Indians that lived there were able to harvest maize, beans and squash.

Operating hours and seasons 

Park entrance road, trails, and Visitor Center are open all year, except December 25. From May until October the monument is open from 8:00 a.m. to 5:00 p.m. MST and is open from 9:00 a.m. to 5:00 p.m. MST the remainder of the year. Entry to park trails closes 1 hour before the monument closes.

The Walnut Canyon site is near Flagstaff.  It is 7 miles east of I-40 and 3 miles south of exit 204. The park has a museum and a small visitor center atop a cliff.  Many of the ancient dwellings were built around a U-shaped meander in the canyon, where the creek circles around three sides of a high rocky plateau, almost creating an 'island', and this region now forms the central attraction of the national monument.  There are other ruins in the surround area which are not open to the public.  Other dwellings of the Sinagua people can be found in the nearby Tuzigoot and Montezuma Castle monuments.

The Old Headquarters is listed on the National Register of Historic Places.

See also
 List of national monuments of the United States

References

External links

 Walnut Canyon National Monument. Official NPS website.
 American Southwest, a National Park Service Discover Our Shared Heritage Travel Itinerary
 
 

National Park Service National Monuments in Arizona
Cliff dwellings
Canyons and gorges of Arizona
Landforms of Coconino County, Arizona
Museums in Coconino County, Arizona
Ancient Puebloan archaeological sites in Arizona
Native American museums in Arizona
Parks in Arizona
Archaeological sites on the National Register of Historic Places in Arizona
National Register of Historic Places in Coconino County, Arizona
1915 establishments in Arizona
Protected areas established in 1915
Protected areas of Coconino County, Arizona
Former populated places in Coconino County, Arizona
Historic districts on the National Register of Historic Places in Arizona
Sinagua